Major General Paulus Reinhold af Uhr (25 January 1892 – 28 April 1972) was a Swedish Air Force officer. He also competed at the 1912 Summer Olympics.

Early life

af Uhr was born on 25 January 1892 in Bondkyrka, Uppsala County, Sweden, the son of builder Otto af Uhr and Anna (née Ferm). He passed studentexamen in Uppsala on 31 May 1911 and became a volunteer in the Life Regiment Grenadiers (I 3) on 2 June 1911. af Uhr was transferred to the Jämtland Ranger Regiment (I 23) on 1 June 1912. About a month later, af Uhr finished 23rd in the high jump competition during the 1912 Summer Olympics.

Career
He became an officer on 18 December 1913 and was commissioned as a underlöjtnant in the Jämtland Ranger Regiment on 31 December the same year. af Uhr participated in the Baltic Games during the Baltic Exhibition in Malmö in 1914. af Uhr was promoted to lieutenant in the Jämtland Ranger Regiment on 11 February 1916 and then served in the aviation services of the Field Telegraph Corps from 1918 to 1919. He then became captain in the newly established Swedish Air Force on 29 June 1926 and in the Jämtland Ranger Regiment on 30 December the same year. af Uhr was educated at the Royal Swedish Army Staff College from 1931 to 1933 and was promoted to major in the Swedish Air Force on 25 July 1934.

af Uhr was appointed head of the Education Department at the Air Staff in 1934 and was then head of the Operation Department at the Air Staff from 1936 to 1937. He was promoted to lieutenant colonel on 30 April 1937 and was appointed chief of the Military Office of the Air Force (Flygvapnets kommandoexpedition) the same year. af Uhr was promoted to colonel on 22 June 1939 (effective from 1 July) and was appointed commanding officer of the First Air Group (E 1) on 1 July 1942. He was promoted to major general on 1 April 1946 and left the position at the First Air Group in 1952 when he became Vice CEO of Östermans Aero AB. af Uhr left Östermans in 1957.

Other work
He was chairman of executive committee of the Royal Swedish Aero Club in 1939 and vice chairman of Royal Swedish Aero Club in 1954. He became a member of the Royal Swedish Academy of War Sciences in 1944.

Personal life
On 21 August 1919 at Vårdnäs Church in Östergötland County he married Anna Elisabet Gustava (Elsa) Linderstam (born 8 November 1894 in Norrköping), the daughter of the wholesaler Erik Gunnar Linderstam and his wife Anna Maria Elisabet Jansson. They had three children; Jan Olof Reinhold (born 6 December 1920 in Linköping), Anna Ragnhild Gunilla (born 15 July 1924 in Malmslätt) and Elsa Katharina Margareta Ulrika (born 28 December 1927 in Malmslätt).

Awards and decorations
af Uhr's awards:

Swedish
   Commander 1st Class of the Order of the Sword (6 June 1945)
   Commander 1st Class of the Order of Vasa (5 June 1943)
  Royal Swedish Aero Club's Gold Medal
  Östergötland Rifle Association's Silver Medal (Östergötlands skytteförbunds silvermedalj)
  NAKFSM

Foreign
  Grand Officer of the Order of the Crown of Italy
  Commander of the Order of the White Rose of Finland
  Commander of the Order of the German Eagle
  Second Class of the Order of the Cross of Liberty with Swords
  Finnish commemorative medal Pro benignitate humana
  Officer of the Order of the Lithuanian Grand Duke Gediminas
  Knight of the Order of the Dannebrog
  Finnish Air Force's aviation badge (Finska luftstridskrafternas flygmärke)
  Italian Air Force's aviation badge (Italienska luftstridskrafternas flygmärke)
  Polish Air Force's aviation badge (Polska luftstridskrafternas flygmärke)

References

External links
 Profile at Swedish Olympic Committee
Profile at Sports Reference

1892 births
1972 deaths
Swedish Air Force major generals
Swedish male high jumpers
Olympic athletes of Sweden
Athletes (track and field) at the 1912 Summer Olympics
People from Uppsala Municipality
Members of the Royal Swedish Academy of War Sciences
Commanders First Class of the Order of the Sword
Commanders First Class of the Order of Vasa
Sportspeople from Uppsala County